Yellow Lily is a 1928 American silent drama film directed by Alexander Korda and starring Billie Dove, Clive Brook and Gustav von Seyffertitz. The film closely followed the formula of Korda's first American film The Stolen Bride.

Cast
 Billie Dove - Judith Peredy 
 Clive Brook - Archduke Alexander 
 Gustav von Seyffertitz - Kinkelin 
 Marc McDermott - Archduke Peter 
 Nicholas Soussanin - Dr. Eugene Peredy 
 Eugenie Besserer - Archduchess 
 Jane Winton - Mademoiselle Julie 
 Charles Puffy - Mayor of Tarna

References
Notes

Bibliography
 Kulik, Karol. Alexander Korda: The Man Who Could Work Miracles. Virgin Books, 1990.

External links

1928 films
1928 drama films
Silent American drama films
American silent feature films
Films directed by Alexander Korda
First National Pictures films
Films set in Austria
Films set in Hungary
Films set in the 1890s
American black-and-white films
Films with screenplays by Bess Meredyth
1920s American films